Als wären wir für immer is an EP by German Industrial/EBM band Die Krupps. It was released on December 3, 2010.

Background
Although the band had released new material soon after their reunion in 2005, the EP is advertised as the first Die Krupps recording with new songs in 13 years. The original plan was for the release to be a single titled "Beyond". The track Dr. Mabuse made its first appearance in 1984 as single from the album A Secret Wish of Ralf Dörper's former band Propaganda.

Track list

Personnel
 Jürgen Engler - vocals, keyboards, guitar, bass, cover design, logo, photos
 Marcel Zürcher - guitars
 Ralf Dörper - samples
 Chris Leitz - programming, engineering
 Maria Kalinichenko - backing vocals on Dr. Mabuse
 RpunktDESIGN Hannover - artwork

References

Die Krupps albums